Cold Moon is a 2016 drama-horror film based on Michael McDowell's 1980 novel Cold Moon Over Babylon. It stars Josh Stewart and Christopher Lloyd. The film was released on 27 October 2016.

Synopsis
In the tiny town of Babylon, Florida, sixteen-year-old Margaret Larkin (Sara Catherine Bellamy) goes missing, only to be found murdered and thrown in the river, tied to her own bicycle. The town is enveloped by the mystery of a killer in their midst; meanwhile, the killer himself, Nathan Redfield (Josh Stewart), sociopathic son of a prominent town banker (Christopher Lloyd), proceeds with his scheme to murder the rest of the Larkin family in order for the bank to acquire the Larkin's valuable, petroleum-rich property.  Nathan additionally schemes to pin blame for the murders on the high school principal (Marcus Lyle Brown).  The Larkin family members, however, return from the grave to exact revenge against Nathan, although he is the only one who can see these phantasms.  Nathan's seeming hallucinations and drinking escalate until he finally snaps and gets his comeuppance.

Cast
Josh Stewart as Nathan Redfield
Sara Catherine Bellamy as Margaret Larkin
Candy Clark as Evelyn Larkin
Frank Whaley as Sheriff Ted Hale
Rachele Brooke Smith as Belinda Hale
Robbie Kay as Ben Redfield
Christopher Lloyd as James Redfield
Madison Wolfe as Mandy
Chester Rushing as Jerry Larkin
Marcus Lyle Brown as Walter Perry
Joe Chrest as Charles Darrish
Laura Cayouette as Ginny Darrish
Tommy Wiseau as Rodeo Official

Reception

References

External links
 
 
 

2016 films
American supernatural horror films
2016 horror films
Films based on American novels
2010s English-language films
Films directed by Griff Furst
2010s American films